Satyrium odorum is a species of orchid endemic to southwestern Cape Province.

References 

odorum
Endemic orchids of South Africa
Taxa named by Otto Wilhelm Sonder